HMS Felmersham was one of 93 ships of the  of inshore minesweepers.

Their names were all chosen from villages ending in -ham. The minesweeper was named after Felmersham in Bedfordshire.

References
Blackman, R.V.B. ed. Jane's Fighting Ships (1953)

1953 ships
Cold War minesweepers of the United Kingdom
Ham-class minesweepers
Ham-class minesweepers of the Royal Malaysian Navy
Royal Navy ship names
Ships built in England
HMS